Thadou or Thado may refer to:

Thadou people, an ethnic group in India, Burma and Bangladesh
Thadou language, a Kuki-Chin language of the Thadou people